Basadi or Basedi may refer to:
 Basadi-ye Hajj Barun
 Basadi-ye Olya
 Basadi-ye Sofla